Omate is a town in Southern Peru, capital of the province General Sánchez Cerro in the region Moquegua.

Geography

Climate

References

Populated places in the Moquegua Region